Stanko Yovchev (born 15 April 1988) is a Bulgarian footballer, who plays as a forward.

Career 
He started his career in the local academy. In 2002 he was transferred to CSKA’s academy where the coach was Alexander Yordanov and the academy was headed by Ivaylo Kotev. From 2007 he was starring in CSKA’s official matches and his first official debut for CSKA took place against Lokomotiv Sofia. During that time CSKA’s coach was Stoycho Mladenov. In 2011 he played in many official CSKA matches and friendlies. In January 2012 he was part of the team led by Dimitar Penev who won a tournament in Libya. He is a Lokomotiv Plovdiv player since the summer of 2013.

External links 

1988 births
Living people
People from Sandanski
Bulgarian footballers
First Professional Football League (Bulgaria) players
PFC CSKA Sofia players
PFC Lokomotiv Plovdiv players
Expatriate footballers in Greece
Association football forwards
Sportspeople from Blagoevgrad Province